The Rarotonga starling (Aplonis cinerascens) is a species of starling in the family Sturnidae. It is endemic to the Cook Islands.

Its natural habitat is subtropical or tropical moist montane forests. It is threatened by habitat loss.

References

External links
BirdLife Species Factsheet
Photos of rarotonga starling in ARKive

Rarotonga starling
Birds of the Cook Islands
Rarotonga
Rarotonga starling
Taxonomy articles created by Polbot